is a near-Earth object of the Apollo asteroid group with a high orbital eccentricity, approximately 1.2 kilometers in diameter. It was discovered on 26 April 2006, by LINEAR at Lincoln Lab's ETS in Socorro, New Mexico, United States.

Orbit and classification 

 orbits the Sun at a distance of 0.1–5.1 AU once every 4 years and 2 months (1,527 days). Its orbit has an eccentricity of 0.97 and an inclination of 33° with respect to the ecliptic.

It is the asteroid with the third-smallest known perihelion of any known object orbiting the Sun. Its extreme orbital eccentricity brings it within 0.081 AU of the Sun (26% of Mercury's perihelion) and as far as 5.118 AU from the Sun (making it a Jupiter-grazer).

The small bodies with even more eccentric orbits are likely to suffer a rotational breakup by the age comparable to that of the Solar System, although 2006 HY51 itself is not expected to break.

Physical characteristics 

According to the survey carried out by NASA's Wide-field Infrared Survey Explorer with its subsequent NEOWISE mission,  measures 1.218 kilometers in diameter and its surface has an albedo of 0.157. The asteroid's composition and shape, as well as its rotation period remain unknown. It has an absolute magnitude of 17.2.

Naming 

As of 2017, this minor planet remains unnamed.

References

External links 
 Asteroid Lightcurve Database (LCDB), query form (info )
 Asteroids and comets rotation curves, CdR Observatoire de Genève, Raoul Behrend
 
 
 

394130
394130
394130
394130
20060426